Trujillo Book Festival is an international literary festival held in Trujillo, a Peruvian city. The last edition in 2012 took place on March from days 1 to 12 in the Plazuela El Recreo an historical square of the city and had the participation of Peruvian writers as Arturo Corcuera and Jorge Diaz Herrera, writer honored, and also the young Colombian poet Lucia Estrada

History

In the year 2009 took place the 4th edition of this festival, it was conducted at the Complejo Mansiche with the assistance of writers Laura Restrepo, Gonzalo Rojas and Alfredo Bryce Echenique, among others. It was initially organized by the  "Association Trujillo Art and Literature".

2012
In the year 2012 it was organized by the Peruvian Chamber of Book by agreement with the Provincial Municipality of Trujillo, in the framework of the celebrations of 477 years of Spanish foundation of Trujillo. This time, it is estimated that more than 100,000 visitors attended to the "Plazuela El Recreo" to the 152 cultural and artistic activities, such as book presentations, poetry readings, tributes, lectures, shows and children's activities.

See also
Trujillo
Marinera Festival
Trujillo Spring Festival
Las Delicias beach
Huanchaco
Santiago de Huamán
Victor Larco Herrera District

References

External links

Map of Trujillo, the city of this Book festival

Literary festivals in Peru
Festivals in Trujillo, Peru